David Keith Murray (born February 19, 1955) is an American jazz saxophonist and composer who performs mostly on tenor and bass clarinet. He has recorded prolifically for many record labels since the mid-1970s. He lives in New York City.

Biography
Murray was born in Oakland, California, United States. He attended Pomona College for two years as a member of the class of 1977, ultimately receiving an honorary degree in 2012. He was initially influenced by  free jazz musicians such as  Albert Ayler, Sonny Rollins, Ornette Coleman and Archie Shepp. He gradually evolved a more diverse style in his playing and compositions. Murray set himself apart from most tenor players of his generation by not taking John Coltrane as his model, choosing instead to incorporate elements of mainstream players Coleman Hawkins, Ben Webster and Paul Gonsalves into his mature style.  Despite this, he recorded a tribute to Coltrane, Octet Plays Trane, in 1999. He played a set with the Grateful Dead at a show on September 22, 1993, at Madison Square Garden in New York City. His 1996 tribute to the Grateful Dead, Dark Star, was also critically well received.

Murray was a founding member of the World Saxophone Quartet with Oliver Lake, Julius Hemphill and Hamiet Bluiett. He has recorded or performed with musicians such as Henry Threadgill, James Blood Ulmer, Olu Dara, Tani Tabbal, Butch Morris, Donal Fox, McCoy Tyner, Elvin Jones, Sunny Murray (no relation), Ed Blackwell, Johnny Dyani, Fred Hopkins, Don Pullen, Randy Weston and Steve McCall. David Murray's use of the circular breathing technique has enabled him to play astonishingly long phrases.

Awards
 In 1980 David Murray was named Village Voice Musician of the Decade.
 Murray was honored with the Bird Award in 1986.
 He was awarded a Guggenheim Fellowship in 1989.  
 David Murray and his band earned a Grammy Award in 1989 in the Best Jazz Instrumental Group Performance category for Blues for Coltrane: A Tribute to John Coltrane.
 In 1991 he was honored with the Danish Jazzpar Prize.
 Newsday named him Musician of the Year in 1993.
 He was given an honorary Doctorate Degree in Music, Pomona College in 2012
 He was awarded a legacy grant by the California Arts Council in 2021

Discography

Gallery

References

External links

 
 Unofficial David Murray website
 -commentaires  de CBS 2007 sur bordeauxsalsa.com
 David Murray interview at allaboutjazz.com

1955 births
Living people
Musicians from Oakland, California
Jazz musicians from California
African-American saxophonists
American jazz saxophonists
American male saxophonists
American jazz clarinetists
American jazz composers
American male jazz composers
Free jazz clarinetists
Free jazz saxophonists
Avant-garde jazz clarinetists
American jazz bass clarinetists
Avant-garde jazz saxophonists
Post-bop clarinetists
Post-bop saxophonists
Pomona College alumni
Grammy Award winners
DIW Records artists
Enja Records artists
India Navigation artists
Red Baron Records artists
World Saxophone Quartet members
21st-century American saxophonists
21st-century clarinetists
21st-century American male musicians
Mingus Dynasty (band) members
Justin Time Records artists
Motéma Music artists
Intakt Records artists
21st-century African-American musicians
20th-century African-American people